Golden Secondary School is a dual-track public high school in Golden, British Columbia, part of School District 6 Rocky Mountain. The school is headed by principal Steve Wyer. There is a wide variety of courses held in the school and outside the school. Courses include things such as skiing and snowboarding on the beautiful Kicking Horse Mountain Resort, mountain biking on many trails around Golden and the school also hosts many bantam and senior basketball, volleyball and soccer teams, and Boggle tournaments.  The most notable thing about this school is the Jam Session, which features groups of talented adolescents playing songs they wrote or love to hear to their peers.

The facility also hosts Golden Alternate School, which is a program that provides additional services to "independently driven" students.

School Reports - Ministry of Education
 Class Size
 Satisfaction Survey
 School Performance
 Skills Assessment
 Golden Secondary School

References

High schools in British Columbia
Educational institutions in Canada with year of establishment missing